Sambalut was a Khazar settlement in the north Caucasus (probably in modern Dagestan) from roughly the 7th through the 10th centuries CE.

Khazar towns
Defunct towns in Russia
Former populated places in Russia